Das Echo is a monthly German language newspaper based in Montreal, Quebec, Canada.

History

Das Echo began as the Das Echo des Deutschen Hauses für die deutsch-kanadische Gemeinschaft, founded by Paul Christian Walter in 1978. It first began printing as a quarterly newssheet for the German community in Greater Montreal. Like the majority of newspapers in Germany, it is a subscriber's publication with a comparably small number of freely sold issues. Das Echo and the Deutsche Rundschau are the only newspapers by an ethnic minority (German) in Canada to have stringers in most Canadian provinces and many European countries.

Das Echo faced the delocalisation of its readers from Montreal and the rest of Quebec to other Canadian provinces. Like their English speaking neighbours, many German speaking Quebeckers left the province because of the political turmoil and changes that followed the Quiet Revolution.  In 1979 Walter turned the news sheet into a bimonthly newspaper and two years later it became a monthly newspaper, reporting about the activities of and covering information for the German-speaking communities in the Canadian provinces. In 1982 the title was finally shortened to Das Echo featuring the subtitle von Küste zu Küste, meaning from coast to coast.

From 1984 to 1995 Das Echo experienced a period of extensive growth, exceeding a circulation of 80,000. Das Echo has usually been an ethnic press newspaper, but established itself as an independent source of information in central European affairs in North America. Since the mid 90s Das Echo has earned a steadily growing number of subscriptions from the United States.

A substantial loss of subscriptions during the late 1990s and early years of the new millennium forced the Walter family into restructuring to avoid a financial collapse; the result was more advertising in the newspaper in order to keep a low retail price. On the other hand, the editorial staff was required to reorient the central theme of traditional German Canadian affairs, to reinforce its distinguishing character as German Canadian newspaper.

In about 2006 Das Echo started recovering subscription numbers. The newspaper currently has an average monthly readership of about 100,000. The paper remains one of the largest nationwide German language newspaper in Canada and the United States. Its largest regional readership can be found in the Canadian prairie provinces of Alberta, Saskatchewan and Manitoba. In 2012 Das Echo received the award of the National Ethnic Press and Media Council of Canada.

Das Echo is member of the globally active IMH network, the International Association of German Media (IDM), the National Ethnic Press & Media Council of Canada, dpa, APA, SDA and swissinfo.

See also
List of newspapers in Canada

References

External links

1978 establishments in Quebec
German-Canadian culture in Quebec
Multicultural and ethnic newspapers published in Canada
Monthly newspapers
Newspapers published in Montreal
Newspapers established in 1978
German-language newspapers published in Canada